Bradley Daniel Wanamaker (born July 25, 1989) is an American professional basketball player who last played for the Washington Wizards of the National Basketball Association (NBA). He played college basketball at the University of Pittsburgh. Wanamaker earned an All-EuroLeague Second Team selection in 2017.

High school career
Born in Philadelphia, Wanamaker went to Roman Catholic High School in his hometown, where he played high school basketball. In 2007, he was named the Philadelphia Daily News' Player of the Year as a high school senior.

College career
Wanamaker then went on to play college basketball at the University of Pittsburgh, where he played with the Pittsburgh Panthers, under head coach Jamie Dixon. In his four years at Pitt, Wanamaker scored 1,090 points. As a senior, he was named an honorable mention NCAA Men's Basketball All-American, by the Associated Press.

Professional career

Teramo (2011)
After going undrafted in the 2011 NBA draft, Wanamaker split time in the 2011–12 season between two Italian clubs, the first of which was Banca Teramo Basket

Forli (2012) 
Wanamaker played for Fulgor Libertas Forli in 2012.

Austin Toros (2012) 
Wanamaker returned to the United States to join the Austin Toros.  He joined the Toros just in time to help the team to an NBA Development League title in 2012. Wanamaker had workouts with many NBA teams but was never offered a contract. He also competed in the NBA Summer League several times.

Limoges (2012–2013) 
For the 2012–13 season, Wanamaker moved to Limoges of France's top league, the LNB Pro A, where he averaged 9.0 points and 3.4 rebounds per game.

Pistoia (2013–2014) 
The following season, Wanamaker returned to Italy and signed with Giorgio Tesi Pistoia of Lega Basket Serie A.

Brose (2014–2016) 
On July 2, 2014, Wanamaker signed with Brose Baskets of Germany's Basketball Bundesliga. With Bamberg, he won the 2014–15 Bundesliga and was also named Finals MVP. On June 23, 2015, Wanamaker re-signed with Bamberg for one more season. In the 2015–16 season, Brose played in the EuroLeague, and had a solid season, in which the team reached the Top 16. In the German BBL, Wanamaker was named the Most Valuable Player, after leading the Bamberg team to a second straight national domestic league championship.

Darüşşafaka (2016–2017) 
On June 23, 2016, Wanamaker signed a two-year contract with Turkish club Darüşşafaka Doğuş.

Fenerbahçe (2017–2018) 
On September 7, 2017, Wanamaker signed a one-year contract with the 2017 EuroLeague champions, Fenerbahçe Doğus. In the 2017–18 EuroLeague season, Fenerbahçe made it to the 2018 EuroLeague Final Four, its fourth consecutive Final Four appearance. Eventually, they lost 85–80 to Real Madrid in the final game. In 36 EuroLeague games, he averaged 11.3 points, 2.7 rebounds and 3.8 assists per game, while shooting 41% on his field goal attempts.

Boston Celtics (2018–2020) 
On July 2, 2018, Wanamaker signed a one-year contract with the Boston Celtics. Wanamaker made his NBA debut on October 16, recording 2 points and 1 rebound in a blowout 105–87 win over the Philadelphia 76ers. On July 17, 2019, the Boston Celtics announced that they had re-signed Wanamaker. Over the course of two seasons with Boston, he played in 107 games, averaging 16 minutes, 5.9 points, 2.2 assists, and 1.7 rebounds per game.

Golden State Warriors (2020–2021) 
On November 24, 2020, Wanamaker signed with the Golden State Warriors as a free agent to play backup point guard behind Stephen Curry. In 39 games, Wanamaker averaged 16 minutes and 4.7 points a game.

Charlotte Hornets (2021) 
On March 25, 2021, Wanamaker was traded to the Charlotte Hornets after being out of the Warriors rotation since the All Star break.

Indiana Pacers (2021) 
On October 6, 2021, Wanamaker signed with the Indiana Pacers. On December 27, he was waived.

Washington Wizards (2021–2022) 
On December 29, 2021, Wanamaker signed a 10-day contract with the Washington Wizards via the hardship exemption.

Personal life

Wanamaker is the twin brother of Lithuanian National Basketball League basketball player Brian Wanamaker.

Career statistics

NBA

Regular season

|-
| style="text-align:left;"| 
| style="text-align:left;"| Boston
| 36 || 0 || 9.5 || .476 || .410 || .857 || 1.1 || 1.6 || .3 || .1 || 3.9
|-
| style="text-align:left;"| 
| style="text-align:left;"| Boston
| 71 || 1 || 19.3 || .448 || .363 || style="background:#cfecec;"|  .926* || 2.0 || 2.5 || .9 || .2 || 6.9
|-
| style="text-align:left;"| 
| style="text-align:left;"| Golden State
| 39 || 0 || 16.0 || .353 || .213 || .893 || 1.7 || 2.5 || .7 || .2 || 4.7
|-
| style="text-align:left;"| 
| style="text-align:left;"| Charlotte
| 22 || 0 || 19.5 || .429 || .125 || .889 || 1.8 || 3.4 || .8 || .2 || 6.9
|-
| style="text-align:left;"| 
| style="text-align:left;"| Indiana
| 22 || 1 || 13.3 || .361 || .235 || .909 || 1.6 || 2.2 || .2 || .3 || 3.5
|-
| style="text-align:left;"| 
| style="text-align:left;"| Washington
| 1 || 1 || 27.0 || .400 || – || 1.000 || 4.0 || 7.0 || 2.0 || .0 || 7.0
|- class="sortbottom"
| style="text-align:center;" colspan="2" | Career
| 191 || 3 || 16.2 || .421 || .300 || .907 || 1.7 || 2.4 || .6 || .2 || 5.5

Playoffs

|-
| style="text-align:left;"| 2019
| style="text-align:left;"| Boston
| 4 || 0 || 4.3 || .429|| 1.000 || .750 || .3 || .8|| .3 || .0 || 2.5
|-
| style="text-align:left;"| 2020
| style="text-align:left;"| Boston
| 17 || 0 || 16.1 || .483 || .444 || .875 || 2.0 || 1.8 || .7 || .2 || 4.9
|- class="sortbottom"
| style="text-align:center;" colspan="2"| Career
| 21 || 0 || 13.8 || .478 || .464 || .850 || 1.7 || 1.6 || .6 || .2 || 4.5

EuroLeague

|-
| style="text-align:left;"| 2015–16
| style="text-align:left;"| Brose Bamberg
| 24 || 24 || 28.8 || .443 || .364 || .775 || 4.1 || 4.0 || 1.3 || .1 || 12.2 || 14.0
|-
| style="text-align:left;"| 2016–17
| style="text-align:left;"| Darüşşafaka
| 34 || 33 || 33.5 || .448 || .386 || .864 || 3.1 || 4.6 || 1.5 || .9 || 16.7 || 17.6
|-
| style="text-align:left;"| 2017–18
| style="text-align:left;"| Fenerbahçe
| 36 || 25 ||  26.1 || .410 || .333 || .855 || 2.7 || 3.8 || 1.3 || .1 || 11.3 || 12.9
|- class="sortbottom"
| align=center colspan=2 | Career
| 94 || 82 || 29.5 || .434 || .363 || .844 || 3.2 || 4.2 || 1.4 || .1 || 13.5 || 14.9

College

|-
| style="text-align:left;"| 2007–08
| style="text-align:left;"| Pittsburgh
| 30 || 0 || 11.0 || .329 || .167 || .484 || 1.2 || 1.4 || .4 || .1 || 2.2
|-
| style="text-align:left;"| 2008–09
| style="text-align:left;"| Pittsburgh
| 36 || 0 || 19.0 || .462 || .390 || .746 || 3.3 || 2.1 || .8 || .2 || 5.8
|-
| style="text-align:left;"| 2009–10
| style="text-align:left;"| Pittsburgh
| 34 || 34 || 32.5 || .440 || .362 || .720 || 5.7 || 4.7 || 1.2 || .3 || 12.3
|-
| style="text-align:left;"| 2010–11
| style="text-align:left;"| Pittsburgh
| 34 || 34 || 30.4 || .448 || .327 || .760 || 5.2 || 5.1 || 1.4 || .4 || 11.7
|- class="sortbottom"
| style="text-align:center;" colspan="2"| Career
| 134 || 68 || 23.5 ||.437 || .344 || .722 || 3.9 || 3.4 || 1.0 || .2 || 8.1
|-

References

External links

 eurobasket.com profile
 EuroLeague profile
 LBA profile 
 LNB Pro A profile 
 Pittsburgh Panthers bio
 

1989 births
Living people
American expatriate basketball people in France
American expatriate basketball people in Germany
American expatriate basketball people in Italy
American expatriate basketball people in Turkey
American men's basketball players
Austin Toros players
Basketball players from Philadelphia
Boston Celtics players
Brose Bamberg players
Charlotte Hornets players
Darüşşafaka Basketbol players
Fenerbahçe men's basketball players
Fulgor Libertas Forlì players
Golden State Warriors players
Indiana Pacers players
Limoges CSP players
Maine Red Claws players
Pistoia Basket 2000 players
Pittsburgh Panthers men's basketball players
Point guards
Shooting guards
Teramo Basket players
Undrafted National Basketball Association players
Washington Wizards players